Pontpierre may refer to:
 Pontpierre, Luxembourg, a town in the commune of Mondercange, in Luxembourg
 Pontpierre, Moselle, a commune in the Moselle department in France

de:Pontpierre